Catherine of Austria (1420 in Wiener Neustadt – 11 September 1493 at Hohenbaden Castle in Baden-Baden) was a member of the House of Habsburg and through marriage Margravine of Baden.

Life 
Catherine was a daughter of the Duke Ernest I of Austria and Styria, nicknamed "the Iron" (1377-1424) from his marriage to Cymburgis (1394-1429), a daughter of Duke Siemowit IV of Masovia. Catherine's older brother Frederick III was crowned Holy Roman Emperor in 1452.  She grew up in Wiener Neustadt, together with her brothers Frederick III and Albert VI.

She married Margrave Charles I of Baden-Baden (1427-1475) in Pforzheim 15 July 1447. She expressed the preservation of her high rank by putting the Austrian coat of arms next to the shield of Baden in her personal coat of arms.  after his marriage, Charles I was appointed governor of Further Austria by Archduke Sigismund of Austria and Tyrol. In this position, he became acquainted with Sigismund's councillor Matthäus Hummel.

Catherine outlived her husband, with whom she was joined in tender marriage for 18 years.  She became the ancestress of the House of Baden.  Her son Christopher left her Hohenbaden Castle as a widow seat and built the New Castle in Baden-Baden for himself.

Catherine died in 1493 and was buried in Baden-Baden.

Issue 
From her marriage with Charles I, Catherine had the following children:
 Catherine (15 January 1449 – before 8 May 1484), married on 19 May 1464 to Count George III of Werdenberg-Sargans
 Zimburgis (15 May 1450 – 5 July 1501), married on 19 December 1468 to Count Engelbert II of Nassau-Dillenburg
 Margareta (1452–1495), Abbess in Lichtenthal
 Christopher I, Margrave of Baden-Baden (13 November 1453 – 19 April 1527)
 Albert, Margrave of Baden-Hachberg (1456–1488)
 Frederick (9 July 1458 – 24 September 1517), Bishop of Utrecht

References 
 Constant von Wurzbach: Biographisches lexikon des kaiserthums Oesterreich, S. 401 f., K. K. Hof- und Staatsdruckerei, 1860

External links 
 http://www.guide2womenleaders.com/womeninpower/Womeninpower1450.htm

Footnotes 

Margravines of Baden
15th-century House of Habsburg
1424 births
1493 deaths
House of Zähringen
15th-century German women
15th-century German people
15th-century Austrian women
Daughters of monarchs